The Castilla y León Symphony Orchestra (Orquesta Sinfónica de Castilla y León, OSCyL for short) is a Spanish symphony orchestra based in  Valladolid, the city which serves as the de facto capital of the Castile and León region.

History
It was created in 1991 following the disappearance of the Orquesta Ciudad de Valladolid. 

In 2007 it acquired a purpose-built hall, the Auditorio Miguel Delibes.

Conductors
Jesús López Cobos (1940-2018) was the Director Emeritus.
British conductor Andrew Gourlay held the position of Chief Conductor from 2015 to 2020.
Jaime Martin served as principal guest conductor.

2011–12 staff
 Violins I: Wioletta Zabek (CM), Krzysztof Wisniewski (S), Elizabeth Moore (SA), Cristina Alecu, Irene Ferrer, Irina Filimon, Pawel Hutnik, Vladimir Ljubimov, Eduard Marashi, Renata Michalek, Daniela Moraru, Dorel Murgu, Monika Pisczelok, Nikos Pittas, Piotr Witkowski.
 Violins II: Jennifer Moreau (S), Jordi Moreno (S), Benjamin Payen (SA), Rosario Agüera, Malgorzata Baczewska, Csilla Biro, Anneleen van den Broeck, Julián Gil, Hugo Ladoire, Iuliana Murgu, Blanca Sanchís, Gregory Steyer, Joanna Zagrodzka.
 Violas: Nestor Pou (S), Marc Charpentier (SA), Michal Ferens, Ciprian Filimon, Harold Hill, Doru Jijian, Julian Samuel, âula Santos, Luis Thau, Jokin Urtasun
 Cello: Marius Díaz (S), Aldo Mata (SA), Montserrat Aldomá, Mary Helen Blossom, Etienne Cardoze, Pilar Cerveró, Jordi Creus, Marie Delbousquet, Frederik Friessen, Carlos Navarro
 Double basses: Miroslaw Kasperek (S), Joaquín Clemente (SA), Nigel Benson, Federico Esteve, Juan Carlos Fernández, Emad Khan, Nebojsa Slavic

 Flutes: Dianne Winsor (S), Pablo Sagredo (SA), José Lanuza (p)
 Oboes: Sebastián Gimeno (S), Jorge Andrés Pinzón (SA), Juan Manuel Urbán (eh)
 Clarinets: Isaac Rodríguez (S), Laura Tárrage (SA), Vicente Perpiñá (bc)
 Bassoons: Salvador Alberola (S), Igor Melero (SA), Fernando Arminio (cb)

 Horns: José Miguel Asensi (S), Carlos Balaguer (SA), Emilio Climent, José Manuel González
 Trumpets: Roberto Bodí (S), Emilio Ramada (SA), Miguel Oller
 Trombones: Philippe Stefani (S), Robert Blossom (SA), Sean Engel (bt)
 Tuba: José M. Redondo (S)

 Timpani: Juan A. Martín (S)
 Percussion: Ricardo López (S), Tomás Martín (SA), Ricardo Moreno 
 Harp: Marianne ten Vorde (S)

Discography
Both Bragado and Posada conducted the orchestra in recordings for Naxos.

Gourlay oversaw the launch in 2019 of the orchestra's in-house label, releasing its first disc of music by Rachmaninoff, followed by Shostakovich's Symphony no.10.

References

External links
 https://www.oscyl.com/ Official Website

Spanish orchestras
Musical groups established in 1991
1991 establishments in Spain